Chloroclystis omocydia is a moth in the family Geometridae. It was described by Prout in 1958. It is endemic to New Guinea.

References

External links

Moths described in 1958
omocydia
Endemic fauna of New Guinea